Federal Highway 71 ( La Carretera Federal 71 ) (Fed. 71) is a free (libre) part of the federal highways corridors of Mexico. Fed. 71 exists in two separate segments; the first runs from Fed. 45 at Luis Moya, Zacatecas in the north to Providencia, Aguascalientes in the south. The second segment runs from San Felipe, Aguascalientes in the north to Villa Hidalgo, Jalisco in the south. The highway continues on from Villa Hidalgo to Teocaltiche as Jal 211.

References

071
Aguascalientes
Transportation in Jalisco
Transportation in Zacatecas